Swansong is an 1887 play by Anton Chekhov, based on his own story "Calchas", concerning an elderly actor.

References

Plays by Anton Chekhov
1887 plays